The Bombardier Invitation is a Canadian sailing dinghy that was designed by Bombardier Research to compete in the same market with the Laser, as a one-design racer. It was first built in 1973.

The design was developed into the Bombardier 3.8 in 1974.

Production
The design was built by Bombardier Limited in Canada starting in 1973, but it is now out of production.

Bombardier Limited applied for a trademark of the Invitation name, for "boats and parts", on 7 December 1973. The trademark was granted on 15 November 1974, but expired on 12 January 1990 and was not renewed.

Design
The Invitation is a recreational sailboat, built predominantly of fibreglass, with wood trim. It has a catboat rig with aluminum spars and a loose-footed mainsail. The hull has built-in foam for buoyancy. The sail is without sail battens, is installed over the two-piece mast with a sewn-in sleeve and can be wrapped around the mast. The hull has an enclosed foredeck, a spooned raked stem, a vertical transom, a wooden, kick-up, transom-hung rudder controlled by a tiller with a hiking stick and a retractable wooden daggerboard. The hull alone displaces .

Retracting the daggerboard allows beaching or ground transportation on a trailer or car roof rack.

For sailing the design is equipped with hiking straps, an adjustable outhaul, a boom vang and a vacuum bailer.

The design has a Portsmouth Yardstick racing average handicap of 99.3 and is normally raced with a crew of one or two sailors.

Operational history
In a 1994 review Richard Sherwood described the Invitation as, "a boat designed for ease in cartopping, with two-piece mast and overhanging two-inch gunwale to assist lifting ... [the] Invitation is a one-design with rigid class rules."

See also
List of sailing boat types

Related development
Bombardier 3.8

Similar sailboats
Laser (dinghy)

References

External links

Bombardier Invitation photos

Dinghies
1970s sailboat type designs
Sailboat type designs by Bombardier Research
Sailboat types built by Bombardier Limited